Manuel Redondo García (born 11 January 1985 in Seville, Andalusia) is a Spanish former professional footballer who played as a left-back.

Career statistics

Honours
Sevilla B
Segunda División B: 2006–07

Sevilla
Copa del Rey: 2009–10

Oviedo
Segunda División B: 2014–15

References

External links

1985 births
Living people
Spanish footballers
Footballers from Seville
Association football defenders
Segunda División players
Segunda División B players
Tercera División players
Sevilla FC C players
Sevilla Atlético players
Sevilla FC players
SD Ponferradina players
CE Sabadell FC footballers
Xerez CD footballers
Real Oviedo players
Coria CF players
Manuel Redondo
Cypriot First Division players
Doxa Katokopias FC players
Spanish expatriate footballers
Expatriate footballers in Thailand
Expatriate footballers in Cyprus
Spanish expatriate sportspeople in Thailand
Spanish expatriate sportspeople in Cyprus